In the mathematical study of functional analysis, the Banach–Mazur distance is a way to define a distance on the set  of -dimensional normed spaces. With this distance, the set of isometry classes of -dimensional normed spaces becomes a compact metric space, called the Banach–Mazur compactum.

Definitions 

Equipped with the metric δ, the space of isometry classes of -dimensional normed spaces becomes a compact metric space, called the Banach–Mazur compactum.

Many authors prefer to work with the multiplicative Banach–Mazur distance

Properties 
F. John's theorem on the maximal ellipsoid contained in a convex body gives the estimate:

  

where  denotes  with the Euclidean norm (see the article on  spaces).

The proof consists in showing that the required estimate is true with large probability for two independent copies of the normed space 

 is an absolute extensor. On the other hand, is not homeomorphic to a Hilbert cube.

See also

Notes

References 
 
 
 
 https://planetmath.org/BanachMazurCompactum
 A note on the Banach-Mazur distance to the cube
 The Banach-Mazur compactum is the Alexandroff compactification of a Hilbert cube manifold

Functional analysis
Metric geometry
Metric spaces